Russia has had three adaptations of the singing competition The X Factor under three different titles: 
 Sekret Uspekha (Секрет Успеха), which was aired from 2005–2007 on RTR
 Faktor A (Фактор А), which premiered on April 1, 2011 on Russia 1 (successor of RTR)
 Glavnaya Stsena (Главная Сцена), which premiered on January 29, 2015 on Russia 1

Russia
Russian television series based on British television series
2000s Russian television series
2005 Russian television series debuts
2007 Russian television series endings
2010s Russian television series
2011 Russian television series debuts
2011 Russian television series endings